Bhushan Pradhan (born 25 November 1986) is an Indian film, web series and theatre actor in Marathi. He has starred in movies like Aamhi Doghi, Coffee Ani Barach Kahi, Satarangi Re, Miss Match, Timepass, Timepass 2 and more. Bhushan received accolades for his role of Damodar Hari Chapekar in ZEE5 Originals web series Gondya Aala Re.

In 2018, he was appreciated for his role as Raam in Pratima Joshi's directorial debut Aamhi Doghi and also for his role as Leartes in Chandrakant Kulkarni directed William Shakespeare play Hamlet. Bhushan has an affinity for portraying historical figures on-screen. Bhushan’s portrayal of Chhatrapati Shivaji Maharaj in the series Jay Bhavani Jay Shivaji received a lot of love from the audience. His movies Lagnakallol directed by Mohammad Burmawala and Anya directed by Simmy Joseph are scheduled to release soon.

Media image 

He was ranked twenty-fourth in The Times of India's Top 50 Most Desirable Men of India in 2019.

Filmography

Theater / Plays

Web series

Films

Television

References

External links

Living people
Indian male television actors
21st-century Indian male actors
Male actors from Mumbai
Marathi actors
Indian male film actors
Indian male soap opera actors
Male actors in Marathi television
1986 births